Multiple jeopardy is the theory that the various factors of one's identity that lead to discrimination or oppression, such as gender, class, or race, have a multiplicative effect on the discrimination that person experiences. The term was coined by Dr. Deborah K. King in 1988 to account for the limitations of the double or triple jeopardy models of discrimination, which assert that every unique prejudice has an individual effect on one's status, and that the discrimination one experiences is the additive result of all of these prejudices. Under the model of multiple jeopardy, it is instead believed that these prejudices are interdependent and have a multiplicative relationship; for this reason, the "multiple" in its name refers not only to the various forms of prejudices that factor into one's discrimination but also to the relationship between these prejudices. King used the term in relation to multiple consciousness, or the ability of a victim of multiple forms of discrimination to perceive how those forms work together, to support the validity of the black feminist and other intersectional causes.

Difference from double jeopardy
The framework of multiple jeopardy was created as a response to the double or triple jeopardy assumption, which, as understood by Dr. Deborah K. King, correlates each mode of discrimination with individual and independent effects that, when added together, will create the full picture of the discrimination one faces. Deborah K. King likens this model to a mathematical equation: "racism plus sexism plus classism equals triple jeopardy". If, for example, it were to be understood that, as a result of racism, black people in the workplace face an earnings disadvantage compared to white men, and women in the workplace face an earnings disadvantage due to sexism, then double jeopardy would assume that a black woman would see an earnings disadvantage of no more or less than the sum of that faced by black people and women on their own. This assumption runs contrary to the idea of intersectionality by asserting that individuals do not face unique forms of discrimination as a result of the various aspects of their identity such as gender or race, and that discrimination can instead be predicted as the sum of the effects each of these aspects has on the way they are treated.

By contrast, multiple jeopardy is founded on the idea that each mode of discrimination is multiplicative, and thus the relationship between racism, sexism and classism would instead be represented as "racism multiplied by sexism multiplied by classism". King uses this equation to argue that the institutional context behind the ways that race, sex, and class are treated in society can create unique types of discrimination that differ vastly from the discrimination associated with each of these factors, such that the discrimination experienced by a black woman is much more than just the sum of the discrimination that a black man and a white woman would experience.

King illustrates this concept by recounting the ill treatment of black women during the era of slavery in the United States. At that time, black workers were subjected to demanding physical labor and brutal punishments. Black men and black women were both victims of this practice, but black women also endured subjugation exclusive to women; as Angela Davis explained in Women, Race, and Class, "If the most violent punishments of men consisted in floggings and mutilations, women were flogged and mutilated, as well as raped." King explains that while rape was a common punishment for women, the rape and impregnation of black women was used to strengthen and perpetuate the slave trade because it helped produce capital - being, in this case, more slaves. King concludes that the rape of black women in the era of slavery was critically differentiated from the rape of women as a whole because it existed as the product of contemporary, institutional racism, and could not have existed without relation to said racism.

Multiple jeopardy and multiple consciousness 
Deborah King notes that prior scholars were skeptical of the idea that black feminists could be entirely invested in both the women's rights and black liberation movements, as a result of the racial and sexual politics within each movement. King disagrees, suggesting that black women, as victims of multiple systems of inequality, are able to perceive these systems in action and recognize how they operate together. This awareness is referred to as "multiple consciousness". King suggests that those who are affected by multiple jeopardy exhibit multiple consciousness, giving them a special understanding of the way different inequalities work together to create systems of discrimination in a way a person experiencing just one form of prejudice could not perceive on their own.

While King suggests the relationship between multiple jeopardy and multiple consciousness, there are few studies explicitly examining the link between them. However, scholars have pointed to existing studies on discrimination to support this relationship, noting that, while women are more likely than men to report experiencing discrimination on the basis of gender, minority men are more likely than minority women to report experiencing discrimination on the basis of race or ethnicity. This suggests a difference in one's ability to perceive forms of discrimination when they are victims of more than one system of discrimination.

Multiple jeopardy and the matrix of domination
The matrix of domination refers to the theory that oppression as a result of differences in race, class, gender, sexual orientation, religion, and age, are all interconnected, despite all being in different categories. It is often recognized incorrectly by scholars by prioritizing one form of injustice while ignoring the others. Dr. Deborah K. King, inspired by the works of bell hooks, sought to avoid this when she coined the term multiple jeopardy. She proposes that the multiple inequalities some people face is not expanded through quantity, but by quality. She did not argue that inequalities are all discriminated equally. King is critiquing "single-identity" politics and feminists that rank oppressions.

Multiple jeopardy is related to the matrix of domination. By recognizing the multiple consequences of homophobia and heterosexism for lesbians and gay men, King's multi-jeopardy theory provides a deeper comprehension of the matrix of domination. This term, used by Patricia Hill Collins, refers to how each prejudice intersects and overlap with one another just as an inseparable link, creating an interlocking system of oppression.  In the United States, domination can be seen in institutions such as schools, employment, housing, the government, and other social elements.  The domination of the superior group affects those who are/have been socially oppressed due to the factors that have historically caused them disadvantages. The idea of multiple jeopardy feeds into the concept of the matrix of domination because it is these multiple factors - gender, race, sex, class, religion and other social/cultural identities - that have historically caused many disadvantages for certain groups of people.

See also 

 Intersectionality
 Discrimination
 Social inequality
 Triple oppression
 Matrix of domination
 Black feminism

References

Academic terminology
Majority–minority relations
Sociological theories